Barbara Mary Willard (12 March 1909 – 18 February 1994) was a British novelist best known for children's historical fiction. Her "Mantlemass Chronicles" is a family saga set in 15th to 17th-century England. For one chronicle, The Iron Lily (1973), she won the annual Guardian Children's Fiction Prize, a once-in-a-lifetime book award judged by panel of British children's writers.

Life 
Willard was born in Brighton, Sussex in 1909, the daughter of the Shakespearean actor Edmund Willard and Mabel Theresa Tebbs. She was also the great-niece of Victorian-era actor Edward Smith Willard. The young Willard was educated at a convent school in Southampton.

Because of her family connections, Willard originally went on the stage as an actress and also worked as a playreader, but she was unsuccessful and abandoned acting in her early twenties. She wrote numerous books for adults before she turned to children's literature.

Very little about the author was written during her lifetime, because of her private nature. She died at a nursing home in Wivelsfield Green, East Sussex, on 18 February 1994.

Writing career 
The Grove of Green Holly (1967), which was a story about a group of 17th century travelling players who were hiding in a forest in Sussex from Oliver Cromwell's soldiers, spawned her most famous work, the Mantlemass series (1970–1981) including her Guardian Prize-winning book. Some other books were Hetty (1956), Storm from the West (1963), Three and One to Carry (1964), and Charity at Home (1965).

One of her last books, The Forest - Ashdown in East Sussex, published by Sweethaws Press in 1989, gives a detailed account of  Ashdown Forest. In the introduction to the book, Christopher Robin Milne notes that Willard had moved from her home on the Sussex Downs to the edge of Ashdown Forest in 1956 and that her new surroundings had provided the inspiration and setting for ten of her children's historical novels (eight in the Mantlemass series and two others). It is evident by her own account in her book that she actively involved herself in the affairs of the forest. She was a representative of the forest Commoners elected to the forest's Board of Conservators in 1975, and she remained in that capacity for ten years. She tells how she was later heavily involved in the fundraising campaign which enabled East Sussex County Council to purchase the forest in 1988, enabling it to remain as a place of beauty and tranquility open to the public.

List of selected works

Children's fiction
Mantlemass Chronicles 
 The Miller's Boy, 1976
. 
 The Lark and the Laurel, 1970
 The Sprig of Broom, 1971
 A Cold Wind Blowing, 1972
 The Eldest Son, 1977
 The Iron Lily, 1973
 A Flight of Swans, 1980
 Harrow and Harvest, 1974
 The Keys of Mantlemass, 1981 (a series of short stories that form bridges between the full-length books)

Adult fiction
 Love in Ambush, 1930 (with Elizabeth Helen Devas)
 Ballerina, 1932
 As Far as in me Lies, 1936
 The Dogs Do Bark, 1948
 Portrait of Philip, 1950
 Celia Scarfe, 1951

Other children's fiction
 Hetty, 1956
 Snail and the Pennithornes, 1957
 The Penny Pony, 1961
 Duck on a Pond, 1962
 Storm from the West, 1963
 The Battle of Wednesday Week, 1963
 Three and One to Carry, 1964
 A Dog and a Half, 1964
 Charity at Home, 1965
 Surprise Island, 1966
 The Richleighs of Tantamount, 1966
 The Grove of Green Holly, 1967
 The Gardener's Grandchildren, 1978
 Spell Me A Witch, 1979
 Summer Season, 1981

References

Other sources
 Belinda Copson, Folly Magazine No. 27 (1999). Reprint at Collecting Books & Magazines (collectingbooksandmagazines.com).

External links

 

English children's writers
English historical novelists
Writers of historical fiction set in the early modern period
Guardian Children's Fiction Prize winners
People from Brighton
1909 births
1994 deaths
Place of death missing
English women novelists
British women children's writers
20th-century English women writers
20th-century English novelists
Women historical novelists
People from Wivelsfield